Bull–bear line is the index average line that indicates bull market or bear market in stock market.

Overview
The 250-day moving average line of certain index for previous 250 trading days is treated to be the bull–bear line, which provides reference value for mid-term and long-term investment. If the current index drops below the bull–bear line, some investors believe the market has turned bearish from bullish. If the current index rises above the line, some investors believe the market has turned bullish from bearish.

Financial analysts have different opinions on the bull–bear line. Some believed the 250-day moving average is not the "bull–bear line". According to Dow Theory by Charles Dow, an American journalist, bull market and bear market are defined by investors' mindset. Bull market develops under extremely optimistic situations, while bear market develops under extremely pessimistic situations. There is no limitation on the duration of either market. Investors should bear in mind the transition between bull and bear markets is unpredictable, and determined after the fact.

References

Stock market
Technical analysis